Barry McClements (born 6 December 2001) is a para swimmer from Newtownards, Northern Ireland.

McClements was born with fibular hemimelia, where part of the fibula is missing; his right leg was amputated above the knee at 10 months old, and he competes in the disability class S9, SB8, SM9.

McClements competed for Ireland at the 2020 Summer Paralympics, his best finish being seventh place in the 100 metre backstroke S9.

He won a bronze medal at the 2022 Commonwealth Games, at the 100 m backstroke S9 event, become the first Northern Irish medallist in swimming at the Commonwealth Games.

References

2001 births
Living people
Male swimmers from Northern Ireland
Irish male freestyle swimmers
Irish male backstroke swimmers
Irish male butterfly swimmers
Paralympic swimmers of Ireland
Swimmers at the 2020 Summer Paralympics
21st-century Irish people
Sportspeople from County Down
Swimmers at the 2018 Commonwealth Games
Swimmers at the 2022 Commonwealth Games
People from Dundonald, County Down
People from Newtownards
Commonwealth Games medallists in swimming
Commonwealth Games bronze medallists for Northern Ireland
Medallists at the 2022 Commonwealth Games